Ibrahima Traoré (born 21 April 1988) is a professional footballer who plays as a left winger.

Coming through the youth system, Traoré began his senior career with French amateur club Levallois in 2005. He moved to Germany one year later, playing for Hertha BSC's reserve team Hertha BSC II. Following a season at FC Augsburg in 2009–10, Traoré joined VfB Stuttgart. He remained for four seasons, before moving to Borussia Mönchengladbach in 2014.

Born in France, Traoré was eligible to represent Guinea internationally through his father. He made his debut in 2010, and played for Guinea in three Africa Cup of Nations tournaments (2012, 2015 and 2019).

Early life 
Traoré was born in Villepinte, France, to a Guinean father and a Lebanese mother.

Club career

Early career 
Traoré played youth football with Charenton and Levallois. He made his senior debut with Levallois in the Championnat de France Amateurs 2, before being transferred to German club Hertha BSC on 1 January 2007, making his Bundesliga debut for them on 9 December 2007, against 1. FC Nürnberg.

FC Augsburg 
On 5 March, Traoré began a trial with FC Augsburg, signing a two-year contract with them on 14 July 2009.

VfB Stuttgart 
In May 2011, it was announced that Traoré would move to VfB Stuttgart at the end of the 2010–11 season.

In December 2013, Traoré stated that he had turned down offers from a number of English clubs over the summer.

Borussia Mönchengladbach 

In April 2014, it was announced that Traoré would sign for Borussia Mönchengladbach at the start of the 2014–15 season.

On 8 August 2015, he marked his season debut by scoring in a 4–1 win at FC St. Pauli in the first round of the DFB-Pokal.

In May 2017, he signed a new contract with Borussia Mönchengladbach, lasting until 2021. He made his 100th competitive appearance for the club in October the following year, after coming on as a substitute in a 4–0 win over Mainz.

International career 
Traoré made his international debut for Guinea on 11 August 2010, against Mali. Guinea won the match 2–0, with Traoré scoring Guinea's second goal. In the 2012 Africa Cup of Nations qualification on 8 October 2011, Traoré scored in the last game of group B against Nigeria a last-second equalizer in the 90+12-minute, meaning Guinea's qualification for the 2012 Africa Cup of Nations. In November 2014, concerns were raised about Traoré playing for Guinea due to the ongoing Ebola outbreak in West Africa.

He was selected to Guinea's squad for the 2015 African Cup of Nations and scored the team's equaliser in a 1–1 draw with Cameroon at the group stage. After the tournament, he took a break from international football, returning in March 2016.

Career statistics

International

Scores and results list Guinea's goal tally first, score column indicates score after each Traoré goal.

References

External links 

 

1988 births
Living people
People from Villepinte, Seine-Saint-Denis
Footballers from Seine-Saint-Denis
Association football wingers
Citizens of Guinea through descent
Guinea international footballers
French footballers
Guinean footballers
Bundesliga players
2. Bundesliga players
VfB Stuttgart players
Hertha BSC players
Hertha BSC II players
FC Augsburg players
Levallois SC players
Borussia Mönchengladbach players
Expatriate footballers in Germany
Guinean people of Lebanese descent
French sportspeople of Guinean descent
French people of Lebanese descent
Sportspeople of Lebanese descent
2012 Africa Cup of Nations players
2015 Africa Cup of Nations players
2019 Africa Cup of Nations players
French expatriate sportspeople in Germany
Guinean expatriate sportspeople in Germany
French expatriate footballers
Guinean expatriate footballers
Black French sportspeople